Susanna Phillips (Huntington) is an American singer who has sung leading lyric soprano roles at leading American and international opera houses.

Early life and education
Phillips was born in Birmingham, Alabama and grew up in Huntsville where she attended Randolph School.  She received Bachelor of Music and Master of Music degrees from the Juilliard School where she was a student of Cynthia Hoffmann. In 2002 and 2003 she attended the Music Academy of the West summer conservatory. After completing her master's degree in 2004, she became a member of Santa Fe Opera's Apprentice Program for Singers.

In March 2005, she joined Lyric Opera Center for American Artists at Lyric Opera of Chicago, now the Ryan Opera Center. During her tenure with the program in Chicago she sang Diana in a new Robert Carsen production of Iphigénie en Tauride opposite Susan Graham, and performed Juliette in Roméo et Juliette and Rosalinde in Die Fledermaus.

Career
While at the Lyric Opera of Chicago's LOCAA program, she participated in Santa Fe Opera's 50th Anniversary Arias Gala Concert on August 12, 2006, and sang the role of Pamina in the final two performances of the 2006 season production of The Magic Flute. Following in the 2007 season she sang the role of Fiordiligi in Così fan tutte.

She made her Metropolitan Opera debut on 15 March 2008 singing Musetta in La bohème and has returned to The Met during numerous seasons to sing this role, as well as Pamina (2009, 2010), Donna Anna in Don Giovanni (2012),  Fiordiligi in Così fan tutte (2013, 2014), Antonia in Les contes d'Hoffmann (2015), and Rosalinde in Die Fledermaus (2014, 2015, 2016). In 2010 she won the Met's Beverly Sills Award.

She has held leading operatic roles at numerous companies such as Lyric Opera of Chicago, Oper Frankfurt, Santa Fe Opera, Boston Lyric Opera, Minnesota Opera, Opera Birmingham, Fort Worth Opera, Boston Baroque, Ravinia Festival, Aspen Music Festival, Verbier Festival, Gran Teatre del Liceu Barcelona, Gulbenkian Orchestra in Lisbon, and Hyogo Performing Arts Center in Japan. Highly in demand by the world's most prestigious orchestras, Phillips has appeared with the Royal Stockholm Philharmonic Orchestra under Alan Gilbert, Chicago Symphony Orchestra, San Francisco Symphony Orchestra, Sydney Symphony Orchestra, National Symphony Orchestra (Mexico), Philadelphia Orchestra, Oratorio Society of New York, Santa Fe Symphony Orchestra and Chorus, Santa Barbara Symphony Orchestra, St. Louis Symphony, Music of the Baroque, Chicago, Dallas Symphony Orchestra, Louisiana Philharmonic Orchestra, Milwaukee Symphony Orchestra, Jacksonville Symphony Orchestra, Orchestra of St. Luke's, and Santa Fe Concert Association.

Phillips works in collaboration with other artists in recital and chamber music performances. Such performances have included those with Paul Neubauer and Anne-Marie Montgomery, at the Parlance Chamber Music Series with Warren Jones, the 2014 Chicago Collaborative Works Festival, the Emerson String Quartet in Thomasville, Georgia with Warren Jones and colleagues from the Metropolitan Opera, and at Twickenham Fest.

Repertoire

Opera

 Carmen – Micaëla (Bizet) 
 Les Pecheurs de Perles – Leila (Bizet) 
 Midsummer Night's Dream – Helena (Britten) 
 Peter Grimes – Ellen Orford (Britten) 
 Turn of the Screw – Governess (Britten) 
 L'Elisir d'Amore – Adina (Donizetti) 
 Orfeo ed Euridice – Euridice (Gluck) 
 Roméo et Juliette – Juliette (Gounod) 
 Alcina – Alcina (Handel) 
 Agrippina – Agrippina (Handel) 
 Giulio Cesare – Cleopatra (Handel) 
 Rodelinda – Rodelinda (Handel) 
 Die lustige Witwe – Hanna (Lehar) 
 Manon – Manon (Massenet) 
 Thaïs – Thaïs (Massenet)
 Così fan tutte – Fiordiligi (Mozart) 
 Don Giovanni – Donna Anna (Mozart) 
 Don Giovanni – Donna Elvira (Mozart) 
 Idomeneo – Ilia (Mozart) 
 La finta giardiniera – Sandrina (Mozart) 
 Le Nozze di Figaro – Countess (Mozart) 
 Die Zauberflöte – Pamina (Mozart) 
 Les contes d'Hoffmann – Antonia (Offenbach) 
 Les contes d'Hoffmann – Stella (Offenbach) 
 Dialogues des carmélites – Blanche (Poulenc) 
 A Streetcar Named Desire – Stella (Previn) 
 La bohème – Musetta (Puccini) 
 L'amour de loin – Clémence (Saariaho) 
 Die Fledermaus – Rosalinde (Strauss) 
 La traviata – Violetta (Verdi)

Oratorio/symphonic

Bach
Cantatas (Various)
Christmas Oratorio (Weihnachts-Oratorium), BWV 248
Easter Oratorio (Oster-Oratorium), BWV 249
Magnificat, BWV 243
Masses (Various)
St. John Passion (Johannes-Passion), BWV 245
St. Matthew Passion (Matthäus-Passion), BWV 244

Barber				
Knoxville: Summer of 1915, Op. 24

Beethoven
Egmont, Op. 84
Mass in C, Op. 86
Missa Solemnis, Op. 123
Symphony No. 9, Op. 125

Britten				
Les Illuminations, Op. 18
Spring Symphony, Op. 44
War Requiem, Op. 66

Brahms
Ein deutsches Requiem, Op. 45

Bruckner
Psalm 150, WAB 38
Te Deum in C major, WAB 45

Copland
Eight Songs of Emily Dickinson

Canteloube
Chants d'Auvergne (Songs of the Auvergne)
 
Dvorák
Requiem in B-flat minor, Op. 89, B. 165
Stabat Mater, Op. 58
Te Deum, Op. 103

Gounod 
Christmas Oratorio
St. Cecilia Mass, CG 56
					
Grieg 
Peer Gynt, Op. 2

Handel
Dixit Dominus HWV 232
Messiah, HWV 56

Haydn
Mass No. 10 in C, "Paukenmesse"
Mass No. 11 in d, "Nelsonmesse"
Mass No. 12 in B flat, "Theresienmesse"
Mass No. 14 in B flat, "Harmoniemesse"
The Creation
The Seasons

Mahler
Das Klagende Lied
Symphony No. 2
Symphony No. 4
Symphony No. 8

Mendelssohn 
Elijah, Op. 70
Symphony No. 2 "Lobgesang," Op. 52

Messiaen
Poèmes pour Mi

Mozart				
Concert Arias (Various)
Exsultate, jubilate, K. 165
Mass in C, K. 257, "Credo"
Mass in C, K. 317, "Coronation"
Mass in c, K. 427, "The Great Mass"
Requiem, K. 626

Orff
Carmina Burana

Pergolesi
Stabat Mater, P. 77

Poulenc 
Gloria, FP 177
Stabat Mater, FP 148

Rachmaninoff
The Bells, Op. 35

Schumann 
Scenes from Goethe's Faust (Paradies und die Peri)

Strauss, R. 
Orchestral Songs
Four Last Songs, TrV 296

Szymanowski
Stabat Mater, Op. 53

Vivaldi 
Gloria, RV 589 
In furore justissime ire, RV626
Laudate Pueri, RV 601

Recital/chamber music

Phillips collaborates with pianists and other instrumentalists for art song recitals and chamber music concerts with a variety of thematic and musical interests.

Discography 
 Wasting the Night, Naxos, 2010, CD
 Paysages, Bridge, 2011, CD
 Poul Ruders, Vol. 8, Bridge, 2012, CD
 The Opera America Songbook, Opera America, 2012, CD
 Colors of Feelings, Delos, 2012, CD
 Brass Rail Blues: Music by Patricia Morehead, Navona Records, 2014, CD
 An AIDS Quilt Songbook: Sing for Hope, GPR Records, 2014, CD
 Dear Theo: 3 Song Cycles by Ben Moore, Delos, 2014, CD

Awards and recognition
 Operalia International Opera Competition, First Place and the Audience Prize (2005)
 Metropolitan Opera National Council Auditions (2005)
 MacAllister Awards (2005)
 George London Foundation Awards Competition (2005)
Marilyn Horne Foundation Competition
 American Opera Society Competition
 Musicians Club of Women Chicago
 Sullivan Foundation
 Beverly Sills Award (2010)
 Space Camp Hall of Fame (2015)

References

External links
Susanna Phillips official website
Twickenham Fest official website

American operatic sopranos
Year of birth missing (living people)
Living people
Operalia, The World Opera Competition prize-winners
Musicians from Birmingham, Alabama
Musicians from Huntsville, Alabama
Juilliard School alumni
Winners of the Metropolitan Opera National Council Auditions
21st-century American  women opera singers
Music Academy of the West alumni